Sims is an unincorporated community and census-designated place (CDP) in Sims Township, Grant County, Indiana. In 2010 it had a population of 156.

History
The community took its name from Sims Township. A post office was established at Sims in 1881, and remained in operation until it was discontinued in 1992.

Geography
Sims is located at  near the western border of Grant County. A rail line operated by the Central Railroad Company of Indianapolis passes along the north side of town.

Demographics

References

Census-designated places in Grant County, Indiana
Census-designated places in Indiana